Ozaryntsi (translit. Azarenits) is a village in the Mohyliv-Podilskyi Raion (district) of the Vinnytsia Oblast (province), Ukraine.

Famous people from Ozaryntsi
 Aliza Greenblatt (1888–1975) – Yiddish poet.

External links
 http://www.ozarinci.narod.ru
 http://ukraine.kingdom.kiev.ua/region/01/ozarynzi.php
 http://www.castles.com.ua/ozar.html
 Weather in Ozaryntsi
 The murder of the Jews of Ozaryntsi during World War II, at Yad Vashem website.

Holocaust locations in Ukraine

Mogilyovsky Uyezd (Podolian Governorate)
Mohyliv-Podilskyi Raion
Villages in Mohyliv-Podilskyi Raion